Nicholas Harpsfield (1519–1575) was an English historian and a Roman Catholic apologist and priest under Henry VIII, whose policies he opposed.

Early life and exile
Harpsfield was educated at Winchester College and studied canon and civil law in New College, Oxford, receiving a BCL in 1543.  In Oxford he became connected to the circle of Thomas More, of whom he later wrote a biography, which he dedicated to William Roper in gratitude for his patronage.  With the more aggressive religious policies of the English Reformation following the accession of Edward VI in 1547, he left England in 1550 to pursue his studies at the University of Louvain.

Role in the Marian Persecutions
Upon the accession of Mary I in 1553, Harpsfield returned to England, took the degree of DCL at Oxford in 1554, and became Archdeacon of Canterbury in the same year, serving under Reginald Pole.  He superintended hundreds of trials targeting lay Protestants in London, which resulted in punishments and intimidation (though not any charges under the revived Heresy Acts).  He played an active role in the administration of the diocese of Canterbury, where he zealously promoted heresy trials. Foxe's Book of Martyrs (1563 edition) identifies him as "the sorest and of leaste compassion" among the archdeacons involved in the Marian Persecutions and holds him responsible for many deaths in the diocese.

Imprisonment and death
Harpsfield defiantly opposed the new regime of Elizabeth I, opposing the election of Matthew Parker and refusing to subscribe to the Book of Common Prayer.  At some point between 1559 and 1562, he was committed to Fleet Prison, together with his brother John Harpsfield, for his refusal to swear the Oath of Supremacy.  He remained in prison until his release on health grounds in 1574, sixteen months before his death.

Works
 The life and death of Sr Thomas Moore, knight, sometymes Lord high Chancellor of England
 The life of our Lorde Jesus Christe
 Cranmer's Recantacyons
 Treatise on the Pretended Divorce Between Henry VIII and Catherine of Aragon
 Dialogi sex contra summi pontificatus, monasticae vitae, sanctorum, sacrarum imaginum oppugnatores, et pseudomartyres
 Historia Anglicana ecclesiastica

References
Thomas S. Freeman, "Harpsfield, Nicholas (1519–1575)," Oxford Dictionary of National Biography, Oxford University Press, 2004

Further reading
R.W. Chambers, "Life and Works of Nicholas Harpsfield," in The life and death of Sr Thomas Moore, knight, sometymes Lord high Chancellor of England, written in the tyme of Queene Marie by Nicholas Harpsfield, L.D., Oxford: EETS O.S. no. 186, 1932, pp. clxxv–ccxiv.

1519 births
1575 deaths
Writers from London
People educated at Winchester College
Fellows of New College, Oxford
Archdeacons of Canterbury
16th-century English historians
16th-century male writers
Alumni of New College, Oxford
Old University of Leuven alumni